Jerry Franklin Inman (born February 4, 1940, Manhattan, Kansas) is a former American college and professional football player.

Inman played as a defensive lineman for the University of Oregon, and then for the Denver Broncos in both the American Football League and NFL from 1966-1973. In 1974 and 1975, he played for the Portland Storm and the Portland Thunder of the World Football League.

See also
Other American Football League players

References

External links
  Jerry Inman statistics at databasefootball.com
 Pro-Football-Reference.com statistics

Living people
1940 births
Oregon Ducks football players
Denver Broncos players
Denver Broncos (AFL) players